Sali Kandeh (also Romanized as Sālī Kandeh) is a village in Chaharkuh Rural District, in the Central District of Kordkuy County, Golestan Province, Iran. At the 2006 census, its population was 1,650, in 405 families.

References 

Populated places in Kordkuy County